Absorbance is  defined as "the logarithm of the ratio of incident to transmitted radiant power through a sample (excluding the effects on cell walls)". Alternatively, for samples which scatter light, absorbance may be defined as "the negative logarithm of one minus absorptance, as measured on a uniform sample". The term is used in many technical areas to quantify the results of an experimental measurement. While the term has its origin in quantifying the absorption of light, it is often entangled with quantification of light which is “lost” to a detector system through other mechanisms. What these uses of the term tend to have in common is that they refer to a logarithm of the ratio of a quantity of light incident on a sample or material to that which is detected after the light has interacted with the sample.  

The term absorption refers to the physical process of absorbing light, while absorbance does not always measure only absorption; it may measure attenuation (of transmitted radiant power) caused by absorption, as well as reflection, scattering, and other physical processes.

History and uses of the term absorbance

Beer-Lambert law 
For scattering media, the constant is often divided into two parts, separating it into a scattering coefficient, and an absorption coefficient, obtaining: .

If a size of a detector is very small compared to the distance traveled by the light, any light that is scattered by a particle, either in the forward or backward direction, will not strike the detector. Because the absorption portion is more distinct and tends to ride on a background of the scatter portion, it is often used to identify and quantify the absorbing species. Some disciplines by convention use decadic absorbance rather than Napierian absorbance, resulting in:     (with the subscript 10 usually not shown).

Beer–Lambert law with non-scattering samples 
Within a homogeneous medium such as a solution, there is no scattering.  For this case, researched extensively by August Beer, the concentration of the absorbing species follows the same linear response as the path-length.  Additionally, the contributions of individual absorbing species are additive.  This is a very favorable situation, and made absorbance an absorption metric far preferable to absorption fraction (absorptance).  This is the case for which the term "absorbance" was first used.

Absorbance for scattering samples 
For samples which scatter light, absorbance is defined as "the negative logarithm of one minus absorptance as measured on a uniform sample". For decadic absorbance, this may be symbolized as:     . If a sample both transmits and remits light, and is not luminescent, the fraction of light absorbed, remitted, and transmitted add to 1, or:   . Note that  , and the formula may be written as:  .

Even though this absorbance function is very useful with scattering samples, the function does not have the same desirable characteristics as it does for non-scattering samples.  There is, however, a property called absorbing power  which may be estimated for these samples.  The absorbing power of a single unit thickness of material making up a scattering sample is the same as the absorbance of the same thickness of the materiel in the absence of scatter.

Optics 
In optics, absorbance or decadic absorbance is the common logarithm of the ratio of incident to transmitted radiant power through a material, and spectral absorbance or spectral decadic absorbance is the common logarithm of the ratio of incident to transmitted spectral radiant power through a material. Absorbance is dimensionless, and in particular is not a length, though it is a monotonically increasing function of path length, and approaches zero as the path length approaches zero. The use of the term "optical density" for absorbance is discouraged.

Mathematical definitions

Absorbance of a material
The absorbance of a material, denoted A, is given by
 
where
  is the radiant flux transmitted by that material,
  is the radiant flux received by that material,
  is the transmittance of that material.

Absorbance is a dimensionless quantity. Nevertheless, the absorbance unit or AU is commonly used in ultraviolet–visible spectroscopy and its high-performance liquid chromatography applications, often in derived units such as the milli-absorbance unit (mAU) or milli-absorbance unit-minutes (mAU×min), a unit of absorbance integrated over time.

Absorbance is related to optical depth by
 
where τ is the optical depth.

Spectral absorbance
Spectral absorbance in frequency and spectral absorbance in wavelength of a material, denoted Aν and Aλ respectively, are given by
 
 
where
 Φe,νt is the spectral radiant flux in frequency transmitted by that material,
 Φe,νi is the spectral radiant flux in frequency received by that material,
 Tν is the spectral transmittance in frequency of that material,
 Φe,λt is the spectral radiant flux in wavelength transmitted by that material,
 Φe,λi is the spectral radiant flux in wavelength received by that material,
 Tλ is the spectral transmittance in wavelength of that material.

Spectral absorbance is related to spectral optical depth by
 
 
where
 τν is the spectral optical depth in frequency,
 τλ is the spectral optical depth in wavelength.

Although absorbance is properly unitless, it is sometimes reported in "absorbance units", or AU. Many people, including scientific researchers, wrongly state the results from absorbance measurement experiments in terms of these made-up units.

Relationship with attenuation

Attenuance
Absorbance is a number that measures the attenuation of the transmitted radiant power in a material. Attenuation can be caused by the physical process of "absorption", but also reflection, scattering, and other physical processes. Absorbance of a material is approximately equal to its attenuance when both the absorbance is much less than 1 and the emittance of that material (not to be confused with radiant exitance or emissivity) is much less than the absorbance. Indeed,
 
where
 Φet is the radiant power transmitted by that material,
 Φeatt is the radiant power attenuated by that material,
 Φei is the radiant power received by that material,
 Φee is the radiant power emitted by that material,
that is equivalent to
 
where
 T = Φet/Φei is the transmittance of that material,
 ATT = Φeatt/Φei is the attenuance of that material,
 E = Φee/Φei is the emittance of that material,
and according to Beer–Lambert law, so
 
and finally

Attenuation coefficient
Absorbance of a material is also related to its decadic attenuation coefficient by
 
where
 l is the thickness of that material through which the light travels,
 a(z) is the decadic attenuation coefficient of that material at z.

If a(z) is uniform along the path, the attenuation is said to be a linear attenuation, and the relation becomes
 

Sometimes the relation is given using the molar attenuation coefficient of the material, that is its attenuation coefficient divided by its molar concentration:
 
where
 ε is the molar attenuation coefficient of that material,
 c(z) is the molar concentration of that material at z.

If c(z) is uniform along the path, the relation becomes
 
The use of the term "molar absorptivity" for molar attenuation coefficient is discouraged.

Measurements

Logarithmic vs. directly proportional measurements
The amount of light transmitted through a material diminishes exponentially as it travels through the material, according to the Beer–Lambert law (A=(ε)(l)). Since the absorbance of a sample is measured as a logarithm, it is directly proportional to the thickness of the sample and to the concentration of the absorbing material in the sample. Some other measures related to absorption, such as transmittance, are measured as a simple ratio so they vary exponentially with the thickness and concentration of the material.

Instrument measurement range
Any real measuring instrument has a limited range over which it can accurately measure absorbance. An instrument must be calibrated and checked against known standards if the readings are to be trusted. Many instruments will become non-linear (fail to follow the Beer–Lambert law) starting at approximately 2 AU (~1% transmission). It is also difficult to accurately measure very small absorbance values (below 10−4) with commercially available instruments for chemical analysis. In such cases, laser-based absorption techniques can be used, since they have demonstrated detection limits that supersede those obtained by conventional non-laser-based instruments by many orders of magnitude (detections have been demonstrated all the way down to 5 × 10−13). The theoretical best accuracy for most commercially available non-laser-based instruments is attained in the range near 1 AU. The path length or concentration should then, when possible, be adjusted to achieve readings near this range.

Method of measurement
Typically, absorbance of a dissolved substance is measured using absorption spectroscopy. This involves shining a light through a solution and recording how much light and what wavelengths were transmitted onto a detector. Using this information, the wavelengths that were absorbed can be determined. First, measurements on a "blank" are taken using just the solvent for reference purposes. This is so that the absorbance of the solvent is known, and then any change in absorbance when measuring the whole solution is made by just the solute of interest. Then measurements of the solution are taken. The transmitted spectral radiant flux that makes it through the solution sample is measured and compared to the incident spectral radiant flux. As stated above, the spectral absorbance at a given wavelength is

The absorbance spectrum is plotted on a graph of absorbance vs. wavelength.

A UV-Vis spectrophotometer will do all this automatically. To use this machine, solutions are placed in a small cuvette and inserted into the holder. The machine is controlled through a computer and, once it has been "blanked", automatically displays the absorbance plotted against wavelength. Getting the absorbance spectrum of a solution is useful for determining the concentration of that solution using the Beer–Lambert law and is used in HPLC.

Shade number
Some filters, notably welding glass, are rated by shade number (SN), which is 7/3 times the absorbance plus one:
 
or
 

For example, if the filter has 0.1% transmittance (0.001 transmittance, which is 3 absorbance units), its shade number would be 8.

See also
Absorptance
Tunable Diode Laser Absorption Spectroscopy (TDLAS)
Densitometry
Neutral density filter
Mathematical descriptions of opacity

References

Spectroscopy
Optical filters
Logarithmic scales of measurement